The Schuster Baronetcy, of Collingham Road in the Royal Borough of Kensington, was a title in the Baronetage of the United Kingdom. It was created on 24 July 1906 for the banker Felix Schuster. He was a senior partner in the family firm of Schuster, Son & Co, and was also a finance member of the Council of India from 1906 to 1916. The third baronet was a colonel in the Rifle Brigade. The baronetcy became extinct on his death in 1996.

The physicist Sir Arthur Schuster was the elder brother of the first baronet.

Schuster baronets, of Collingham Road (1906)
Sir Felix Schuster, 1st Baronet (1854–1936)
Sir (Felix) Victor Schuster, 2nd Baronet (1885–1962)
Sir (Felix) James Moncrieff Schuster, 3rd Baronet (1913–1996)

References

Kidd, Charles, Williamson, David (editors). Debrett's Peerage and Baronetage (1990 edition). New York: St Martin's Press, 1990, 

Extinct baronetcies in the Baronetage of the United Kingdom